Pakistani rice dishes are very popular in most regions of Pakistan, which is a major exporter and consumer of rice. Basmati is typically used, and rice dishes are sometimes eaten mixed with other dishes.

The most simple dish of Pakistani cuisine is plain cooked rice (chawal) eaten with dal (lentil). Khichdi is plain cooked rice cooked with dal. The Karhi chawal is plain cooked rice eaten with karhi. Biryani is cooked with beef, lamb, chicken, fish or shrimp.

Plain cooked rice
The rice is rinsed a few times in water and drained until the water turns from milky to clear. The rice should be soaked in water for at least 30 minutes before cooking. The unsoaked rice takes 25 minutes to parboil, whereas the soaked grains take only 15 minutes. Rice should be parboiled till al dente. Place the presoaked rice into a pot with some cold tap water at a ratio of about 1 cup rice to 1.5 cups water. Cook the rice, with he pot lid open, at medium heat till the water is mostly evaporated and tiny pockets of air are visibly forming in the rice as the water level evaporates and goes down below the rice. Once the water is almost fully evaporated, turn the heat to its lowest possible setting and close the lid with as tight a seal as possible. The aim now is to let the last bit of water steam in the pot and the rice will become al dente in the steam, this usually takes anywhere from 3 to 7 minutes.

Rice dishes
The following is a list of most popular rice dishes in Pakistan.

See also

 List of rice dishes

References

External links

 
 Pakistani Food

 
Pakistani cuisine